The New Testament (The Truth) is the second studio album by American rapper Suga Free. It was released on March 2, 2004 via Bungalo/Universal Records. Production was handled by DJ Quik, Big Saccs, Fastlane, Frank Nitty, Hi-C and DJ Koki. It features guest appearances from Cash Flow, Bigg Steele, Chingy, Hi-C and Kokane. It peaked at number 72 on the US Billboard 200 and at number 23 on the Top R&B/Hip-Hop Albums.

Track listing

Charts

References

External links

2004 albums
Suga Free albums
Albums produced by DJ Quik